Leniea lubrica is a species of Antarctic marine red alga.

References

External links
AlgaeBase

Kallymeniaceae
Plants described in 2009